The medusa blenny (Acanthemblemaria medusa) is a species of chaenopsid blenny found in coral reefs around Lesser Antilles, in the western central Atlantic ocean. It can reach a maximum length of  TL.

References

medusa blenny
Fish of the Lesser Antilles
medusa blenny